Ahmed Mohamed Abdulla, (born 12 November 1991) is a Saudi Arabian born footballer who plays as a central midfielder for Haywards Heath Town.

Early life
Of Somali and Yemeni descent Abdulla moved to Enfield, London aged eight. He is available for the selection of Saudi Arabia, Yemen and Somalia, but has pledged any future international career to Saudi Arabia.

Football career
Having previously played for Arsenal's youth team Abdulla joined West Ham as a sixteen-year-old in 2008. He signed his first professional contract, with West Ham, in the summer of 2011. In August 2011, he signed a loan deal with Swindon Town until January 2012. Abdulla made his debut on 3 September 2011 in a 3–2 home win against Rotherham United. In January 2012, Abdulla joined Dagenham & Redbridge on-loan. On his return to West Ham he was released by the club but signed a permanent short-term deal, until the end of the 2011–12 season, with Dagenham in March 2012. In May 2012, Abdulla was released by Dagenham due to the expiry of his contract.

On 4 July 2012, Abdulla signed for Barnet. He scored his first goal for Barnet against Salisbury City on 28 September 2013. His second goal was the winner in a 1–0 win at Hereford United on 19 October. Abdulla was released at the end of the 2013–14 season, though he was invited back for 2014–15 pre-season training. Abdulla played in pre-season friendlies for Barnet in 2014–15 but instead joined Whitehawk, followed by a year at Staines Town. Abdullah re-signed for Whitehawk for the start of the 2016–17 season. In March 2017 he was signed on loan by Metropolitan Police manager Jim Cooper. Ware secured his signature on 11 July 2017. He signed for Heybridge Swifts in February 2018. He left the club in October 2018 in the wake of manager Jody Brown's resignation. Abdulla joined Concord Rangers on 23 October 2018. He joined Hayes & Yeading United for the 2019–20 season. After only three appearances, Abdulla joined Bishop's Stortford. This spell was also short-lived, as he re-joined Ware after only two appearances. Abdulla re-joined Whitehawk in December 2019, but left the club after the end of the curtailed 2020–2021 season. Abdulla joined Sittingbourne for the 2021–22 season and scored a hat-trick on the first day of the new campaign. In January 2022 he joined Bedford, scoring once in ten games and also taking over as caretaker manager for the final three games of the season. He joined Haywards Heath Town for the 2022-23 season.

Career statistics

 Other = Football League Trophy, FA Trophy

References

External links

1991 births
Living people
Saudi Arabian footballers
Saudi Arabian expatriate footballers
Association football midfielders
Arsenal F.C. players
West Ham United F.C. players
Swindon Town F.C. players
Dagenham & Redbridge F.C. players
Barnet F.C. players
Whitehawk F.C. players
Staines Town F.C. players
Metropolitan Police F.C. players
Ware F.C. players
Heybridge Swifts F.C. players
Concord Rangers F.C. players
Hayes & Yeading United F.C. players
Bishop's Stortford F.C. players
Sittingbourne F.C. players
Bedford F.C. players
Haywards Heath Town F.C. players
English Football League players
National League (English football) players
Isthmian League players
Southern Football League players
Saudi Arabian people of Yemeni descent
Saudi Arabian emigrants to the United Kingdom
Saudi Arabian people of Somali descent
Expatriate footballers in England
Saudi Arabian expatriate sportspeople in England
Sportspeople from Jeddah